is a town located in Arida District, in central Wakayama Prefecture, Japan. , the town had an estimated population of 25,940 in 10680 households and a population density of 74 persons per km².

Geography 
Aridagawa is located in the north-center of Wakayama prefecture, with the Aridagawa River running through the center of the town. Although there are some flatlands along the Aridagawa River, most of the town tends to be mountainous.
 Mountains: Mt. Washigamine (589m)
 Flatlands: Aridagawa Plain
 Rivers: Aridagawa River (Futagawa Dam)It was established on January 1, 2006, by the merger of the towns of Kanaya, Kibi and Shimizu, all from Arida District.

Neighboring municipalities
Wakayama Prefecture
Arida, Kainan, Tanabe
Arida District: Yuasa, Hirogawa
Kaisō District: Kimino
Hidaka District: Hidakagawa
Ito District: Katsuragi
Nara Prefecture
Yoshino District: Nosegawa

Climate
Aridagawa has a Humid subtropical climate (Köppen Cfa) characterized by warm summers and cool winters with light to no snowfall. The area is subject to typhoons in summer.

Demographics
Per Japanese census data, the population of Aridagawa has been declining steadily over the past 70 years.

History
Aridagawa was established on January 1, 2006, by the merger of the towns of Kanaya, Kibi and Shimizu, all from Arida District.

Government
Aridagawa has a mayor-council form of government with a directly elected mayor and a unicameral city council of 16 members. Hidaka collectively with the other municipalities of Arida District, contributes two members to the Wakayama Prefectural Assembly. In terms of national politics, the town is part of Wakayama 3rd district of the lower house of the Diet of Japan.

Economy
The economy of Aridagawa is dominated by agriculture (horticulture), especially with citrus fruits. The town is also a major producer of sanshō pepper.

Education
Aridagawa has nine public elementary schools and four public middle schools operated by the town government, and one public high school operated by the Wakayama Prefectural Board of Education..

Transportation

Railway 
 JR West – Kisei Main Line
Fujinami Station

Highways 
  Hanwa Expressway Road
  Yuasa-Gobo Road

Local attractions
Aragijima rice terraces
Kōya-Ryūjin Quasi-National Park

References

External links

Aridagawa official website 

Towns in Wakayama Prefecture
Aridagawa, Wakayama